The siege of Alcántara was a siege between Allied and French forces in 1706, as part of the War of the Spanish Succession. Lord Galway led a force of British and Portuguese soldiers to attack the garrison at Alcántara. Part of James FitzJames, 1st Duke of Berwick's army was lost for the French. In total, ten French battalions laid down their arms and surrendered 60 guns to Galway's troops. The Allies proceeded to occupy Madrid two months later.

References

Conflicts in 1706
Battles of the War of the Spanish Succession
Battles in Extremadura
1706 in Spain
Battles involving England
Battles involving France
France–United Kingdom military relations
England–France relations